Vanguardia, formerly Vanguardia Liberal, is a Colombian regional newspaper, founded in September 1919 in Bucaramanga, Colombia, by Alejandro Galvis Galvis, whose descendants are its current owners. 

It was formerly known as Vanguardia Liberal, until it changed its name in March 2019

References

Publications established in 1919
Spanish-language newspapers
Newspapers published in Colombia
Mass media in Bucaramanga